Pospiviroid is a genus of viroids that most commonly infects tubers. It belongs to the family Pospiviroidae. The first viroid discovered was a pospiviroid, the PSTVd species (potato spindle tuber viroid).

References

External links
 ICTV Report: Pospiviroidae

Viroids
Virus genera